Richard Parson (born May 16, 1980) is a former American football wide receiver in the National Football League. He played college football at Maryland. His community involvement includes the University of Maryland. He continues to work with the School of Public Health and with the Alumni Association.

References

External links
NFL player profile

1980 births
Living people
People from Newark, Delaware
American football wide receivers
Maryland Terrapins football players
Washington Redskins players
Oakland Raiders players
Hamburg Sea Devils players